Walter Foster Barfoot (17 October 1894 – 28 June 1978) was a Canadian Anglican bishop.

Barfoot was educated at Wycliffe College and ordained in 1923. He was a tutor at the College of Emmanuel and St. Chad Saskatoon and then a professor at St John's College, Winnipeg.  He became Bishop of Edmonton in 1941 and Primate of All Canada a decade later. Elected Metropolitan of Rupert's Land in 1953. He retired in 1959 and died in 1978.

References

 

1894 births
University of Toronto alumni
20th-century Anglican Church of Canada bishops
Anglican bishops of Edmonton
Anglican bishops of Rupert's Land
Metropolitans of Rupert's Land
20th-century Anglican archbishops
Primates of the Anglican Church of Canada
Holders of a Lambeth degree
1978 deaths